The 1953 Cornell Big Red football team was an American football team that represented Cornell University as an independent during the 1953 college football season. In its seventh season under head coach George K. James, the team compiled a 4–3–2 record but was outscored 152 to 128. Bill George was the team captain. 

Cornell played its home games at Schoellkopf Field in Ithaca, New York.

Schedule

References

Cornell
Cornell Big Red football seasons
Cornell Big Red football